A wind turbine installation vessel (WTIV) is a vessel specifically designed for the installation of offshore wind turbines. There were 16 such vessels in 2020.

Most are self-elevating jackup rigs. To enable quick relocation in the wind farm it is self-propelled. It also has a slender ship shaped hull to achieve a quick turnaround time with the vessel carrying several foundations or wind turbines each time. Azimuth thrusters are used to position the vessel during jack-up operations. Some vessels use the thrusters in dynamic positioning (without jacking up) to keep the vibrating pile driver steady when installing foundations.

Some may carry five modern wind turbines and lift 700 tonnes 125 meters above deck. Some WTIV use biodegradable hydraulic fluids to minimize ecosystem impact during leaks. A vessel can cost $335 million, or $220,000 per day. A 3-year leasing may cost €90 million. The fleet of 16 vessels are scheduled to expand to 23 vessels by 2023, of which seven can handle the largest turbines.

Projects include a 155 meter crane height, and lift capacity of 1,600—3,000 tonnes. In Korea, some vessels are approved for liquefied natural gas. In China, lack of suitable vessels are slowing the construction of offshore wind farms. Construction of the four-legged US Jones Act-compliant Charybdis started at Keppel in Texas in late 2020, at a cost of a half billion dollars, scheduled for the 700 MW Revolution Wind in 2023 and the 924 MW Sunrise Wind in 2024. Such vessels require 500-800 MW of installation per year for 5 years to be economical.

A supplement to crane-equipped WTIVs can be crane-less feeder vessels with motion compensation. Some WTIV has a crane but no legs.

References